Laxudumau (Lakurumau), spoken in the village of Lakurumau on the island of New Ireland, is an Austronesian language transitional between Nalik and Kara.

Notes

Languages of New Ireland Province
Meso-Melanesian languages
Vulnerable languages